The 2001 NAIA Football Championship Series concluded on December 15, 2001 with the championship game played at Jim Carroll Stadium in Savannah, Tennessee.  The game was won by the Georgetown Tigers over the Sioux Falls Cougars by a score of 49–27.  The win was the second consecutive championship for the Tigers.

Tournament bracket

  * denotes OT.

See also
 2001 NAIA football rankings

References

NAIA Football Championship Series
NAIA Football National Championship
Sioux Falls Cougars football games
Georgetown Tigers football
NAIA Football National Championship
NAIA football